Vedad Karic (born 6 March 1988) is a Bosnian mountain biker and road cyclist, who currently rides for UCI Continental team .

Major results

2008 
2nd Putevima Vukovog kraja
2012
1st Memorijal Svi Tuzlanski biciklisti
2015 
4th Road race, National Road Championships
2016
4th 25 Maj
2017
National Road Championships 
1st  Time trial
2nd Road race
2018 
National Road Championships 
1st  Time trial
1st  Hill climb
3rd Road race
1st Overall Premijer Liga
1st Hercegovina Classic
1st Memorijal Svi Tuzlanski biciklisti
3rd 25 Maj 
2019 
National Road Championships 
1st  Time trial
1st  Hill climb
2nd Road race
1st Overall Premijer Liga
1st Memorijal Svi Tuzlanski biciklisti
2nd 25 Maj
2020 
1st  Hill climb, National Road Championships 
National Mountain bike Championships 
1st  Olympic cross-country (XCO)
1st  Cross-country eliminator (XCE)
1st  Marathon (XCM)
1st Memorijal Svi Tuzlanski biciklisti
1st 25 Maj
2021
National Road Championships
1st  Road race
1st  Time trial
 4th Adriatic Race 
2022
National Road Championships
1st  Road race

References

External links

1988 births
Living people
Bosnia and Herzegovina male cyclists
European Games competitors for Bosnia and Herzegovina
Cyclists at the 2019 European Games